The 2019–20 Bonaire League, or known locally as the 2019–20 Kampionato, is the 50th season of the Bonaire League, the top division football competition in Bonaire. The season began on 25 October 2019 and was postponed after the 11th round of matches due to the COVID-19 pandemic.  The winner of the league will automatically qualify for the 2021 Caribbean Club Shield.

The league grew from eight teams to ten from the previous season with the addition of Young Boys and Arriba Perú.

League table

Top scorers

References

Bonaire League seasons
2019–20 in Caribbean football leagues